Status as of 2008:

National Parks and Integrated Management Natural Areas

See also
 List of national parks (international)

 
Bolivia
Nature conservation in Bolivia
Tourism in Bolivia
National parks
National parks